Imperial Commissioner (Manchu:  hese i takūraha amban) was a high-ranking government official or military general commissioned by the emperor of China during the late Ming (13681644) and Qing (16361912) dynasties. His power was just below that of the emperor, such that he could command viceroys and provincial governors by imperial edict.

Functions

Main responsibilities  
Negotiations with foreign powers, for example Lin Zexu, Qishan and Shen Baozhen) as well as treaty ratification  as exemplified by Qiying, Yixin, Prince Gong and Li Hongzhang.

Manage aid and unite local government in response to large-scale natural disasters.

Subsidiary responsibilities 
Military recruitment and transport. Examples include Tan Lun, Hong Chengchou, Xiang Rong, Zuo Zongtang and Yuan Shikai

List of Imperial Commissioners (middle and late Ming dynasty) 

Imperial Commissioners received a sword of office from the emperor.

 1555 Tan Lun wokou suppression
 1564 Yan Song
 1640 Hong Chengchou against the Qing

List of Imperial Commissioners (late Qing) 

 1838 Lin Zexu (First Opium War)
 1840 Qishan (Qing dynasty)
 1842 Qiying
 1850 Lin Zexu (Taiping Rebellion)
 1852 Ye Mingchen
 1852 Xiang Rong
 1858 Qiying
 1860 Yixin, Prince Gong
 1871 Shen Baozhen
 1875 Zuo Zongtang
 1885 Zuo Zongtang
 1895 Li Hongzhang
 1896 Li Hongzhang
 1911 Zhao Erxun
 1911 Yuan Shikai

See also 
Commissioner

Government of Imperial China
Government of the Ming dynasty
Government of the Qing dynasty